If I Want To is the third studio album by Australian country music singer Jasmine Rae. The album was released on 2 August 2013 and peaked at number 23 on the ARIA Charts. Upon release Rae said "I feel the songs on my new album are a reflection of the journey I've been on in the last two years. This album is an honest conversation between the listener and myself." adding "This isn't just the album I wanted to make, it's the only album I could have made. I personally needed to do this."

At the ARIA Music Awards of 2013, the album was nominated for ARIA Award for Best Country Album.

Reception
Stef Russin from Country Music Channel said "The new album feels different, sounds different and takes you in from the first note holding you until the final melodies fade out. Thirteen tracks simply are not enough." adding "If I Want To is a shoulder to cry on, a friend to pick you up when everything around you falls apart and your best friend on a crazy night out. It is a soundtrack that creates memories for each individual listener and for me, that’s the greatest album you can have in your collection!"

Track listing

Charts

Weekly charts

Year-end charts

Release history

References

Jasmine Rae albums
2013 albums